Roncalli High School is a Catholic high school located in Indianapolis, Indiana, United States. It is located on the south side of Indianapolis and run by Archdiocese of Indianapolis. Roncalli is named for Pope John XXIII, Angelo Giuseppe Roncalli.

Athletics
Team State Championships (21):

Football (10): 1985, 1988, 1993, 1994, 1999, 2002, 2003, 2004, 2016, 2020
Girls' Volleyball (3): 1981, 1998, 2006
Softball (5): 1999, 2001, 2011, 2021, 2022
Baseball (1): 2016
Boys' Volleyball (2): 2018, 2022

Individual State Championships (13):
Wrestling
113 Weight Class (1): 2017
126 Weight Class (1): 2020
145 Weight Class (2): 1976, 2020
152 Weight Class (1): 2023
167 Weight Class (1): 1985
185 Weight Class (1): 1980
Boys' Tennis
Singles (1): 1991
Boys' Swimming and Diving
50 Yard Freestyle (1): 2002
Girls' Track & Field
Shot Put (1): 2004
Long Jump (1): 2017
Gymnastics
Beam (1): 2010
All-Around (1): 2010

Notable alumni
Jim Gibbons - Former CEO of Goodwill Industries
Perry Kitchen - Current soccer player for LA Galaxy
Dick Nalley - Olympic bobsledder in 1980 Winter Olympics
Kyle O'Gara - Former Indy Lights driver
Jim Prestel - Former NFL defensive lineman (1960–67), class of 1955 (SHHS)
Cole Toner - Current NFL offensive guard for Los Angeles Chargers and 2016 NFL draft selection by the Arizona Cardinals
Nick Schnell - Current outfielder in the Tampa Bay Rays minor league system.

See also
 List of high schools in Indiana

References

External links

Roman Catholic Archdiocese of Indianapolis
Schools in Indianapolis
Catholic secondary schools in Indiana
Private high schools in Indiana
Educational institutions established in 1969
IHSAA Conference-Independent Schools
1969 establishments in Indiana
Circle City Conference schools